Sudirman (born on May 5, 1983) is an Indonesian footballer who currently plays for Persepam Madura United in the Indonesia Super League.

References

External links

1983 births
Association football forwards
Living people
Indonesian footballers
Liga 1 (Indonesia) players
Indonesian Premier Division players
Persepam Madura Utama players